United Paper People is the debut album by the Australian band Kisschasy, released on 31 July 2005.

Track listing

Charts

Release history

References

2005 debut albums
Kisschasy albums
Eleven: A Music Company albums